Notoaeschna geminata is a species of dragonfly in the family Telephlebiidae,
known as the northern riffle darner. 
It is endemic to eastern Australia, occurring north of the Hunter River, New South Wales, where it inhabits rapid streams.

Notoaeschna geminata is a large, dark brown to black dragonfly with yellow markings.
It appears similar to Notoaeschna sagittata, the southern riffle darner, which occurs south of the Hunter River.

Gallery

See also
 List of Odonata species of Australia

References

Telephlebiidae
Odonata of Australia
Insects of Australia
Endemic fauna of Australia
Taxa named by Günther Theischinger
Insects described in 1982